The tornado outbreak of April 2, 2006 was a series of tornadoes that occurred during the late afternoon and evening of April 2, 2006, in the central United States. It was the second major outbreak of 2006, in the same area that suffered considerable destruction in a previous outbreak on March 11 and March 12, as well as an outbreak on November 15, 2005. The most notable tornadoes of the outbreak struck northeastern Arkansas, the Missouri Bootheel, and West Tennessee, where several communitiesincluding Marmaduke, Arkansas, Caruthersville, Missouri, and Newbern, Tennessee suffered devastating damage. In total, 66 tornadoes touched down across seven states, which is the most in a single day in 2006. In addition, there were over 850 total severe weather reports, including many reports of straight-line winds exceeding hurricane force and hail as large as softballs, which caused significant additional damage in a nine-state region.

The outbreak was a deadly one; there were a total of 27 tornado-related deaths plus two other deaths from straight-line winds. It was the deadliest tornado outbreak in the United States since the May 2003 tornado outbreak sequence in the first week of May 2003, which killed 48 people. Twenty-six of those deaths were caused by a single supercell thunderstorm which produced damaging and long lived tornadoes from north central Arkansas into northwest Tennessee.

Meteorological synopsis
The outbreak was caused by a cold front that tracked across the central United States, triggered by a deep low pressure area in the Upper Midwest. The warm humid air mass ahead of the cold front, along with high upper-level wind shear, produced supercells across the region.

The outbreak was expected to have started the previous day in the High Plains as the cold front tracked across that region. The supercells didn't really fire up as expected and only one small tornado was reported in Pawnee County, Kansas on April 1. Severe weather that day was largely restricted to significant microbursts and large hail.

The Storm Prediction Center (SPC) issued a moderate risk of severe weather for April 2, with the main risks being tornadoes and large hail. The primary risk area was the central Mississippi Valley and lower Ohio Valley up to central Illinois, where most of the tornadoes touched down. Many tornado watches – if not any PDS watches – were issued across the region. While a significant severe weather event was expected, the extreme nature caught many forecasters by surprise, based on the risk levels and the probabilities estimated by the SPC in the area primarily affected.

Farther north, the initial thunderstorm development in eastern Missouri quickly developed into a squall line, eventually becoming a derecho that produced many embedded – and generally weak – tornadoes and widespread wind damage across Illinois, Indiana, Kentucky, and Ohio. Wind damage was reported in the areas Cincinnati, Ohio, Louisville, Kentucky, and Indianapolis, Indiana among other cities.

The line of storms slowly weakened while traveling eastward, and the severe weather events dissipated later that evening.

Confirmed tornadoes

Marmaduke, Arkansas/Caruthersville, Missouri

The most infamous tornado of the outbreak touched down in Randolph County, Arkansas just south of Pocahontas. The tornado first struck the small community of Shannon at F1 intensity. 3 businesses and 5 homes were destroyed. Another two businesses and two homes had major damage, and 18 other homes had minor damage. Past Shannon, the tornado rapidly intensified into a large high-end F3 as it crossed into Greene County and slammed into the town of Marmaduke. The town was devastated, with 130 homes and 25 mobile homes being destroyed. A pharmacy and some industrial buildings were also destroyed, and the town's water tower was damaged. Multiple vehicles were tossed around, and 15 railroad cars were blown off of the tracks as well. 47 people were injured in town, two of which were airlifted to a hospital. Outside of town, 19 homes and 11 mobile homes were destroyed. In addition, seven houses and two mobile homes had major damage in the county. A car was thrown 80 yards from one residence well.

The tornado then crossed the St. Francis River into Dunklin County, Missouri, where it displayed a multiple-vortex structure. 7 homes were destroyed and 33 others were damaged in rural portions of the county. Multiple power poles were downed as well. The tornado then crossed into Pemiscot County, and struck the town of Braggadocio at F2 intensity. The tornado's only two fatalities occurred at that location when a couple was killed in their car as they tried to flee from the tornado. The tornado then re-intensified to a high-end F3 as it tore through the neighboring town of Caruthersville, destroying roughly half of the community and injuring 130 people. 226 homes were destroyed, and 542 others were damaged in town. The town's water tower, municipal airport, several churches, Caruthersville High School and Middle School, and multiple businesses were destroyed as well. The tornado abruptly dissipated just outside town after traveling 77 miles.

Aftermath
Six months after the tornado, debris remained scattered throughout Marmaduke. Many homes and businesses had been rebuilt; while many others remained in their tornado-damaged state. The Marmaduke water tower, which was heavily damaged, was torn down shortly after the tornado. The primary employer in the area, American Railcar Industries, rebuilt its facility and quickly returned it to operational status.

On August 29, 2006, Caruthersville Emergency Manager and Fire Chief Charlie Jones was awarded the StormReady Community Hero Award for his actions preventing further injuries and fatalities in the area. He ordered the sirens to sound repeatedly and used the fire department's communications frequency to warn of the imminent and extreme danger that lay ahead, which saved many lives that evening. There were no deaths in Caruthersville as a result. More than half the community was destroyed. Charitable outpouring was enormous and several key buildings, including one of the schools, have been rebuilt.

Numerous FEMA trailers – intended for Hurricane Katrina victims but unused and sitting nearby – were redirected to the communities affected in Arkansas, Missouri, and Tennessee after the tornadoes hit.

Damage images

See also
List of North American tornadoes and tornado outbreaks
Tornadoes of 2006

References

External links

Storm Prediction Center preliminary storm reports
Damage pictures in Marmaduke, AR
National Weather Service Memphis, TN summary
National Weather Service Lincoln, IL summary

2006 natural disasters in the United States
Derechos in the United States
F3 tornadoes
Tornadoes of 2006
Tornadoes in Arkansas
Tornadoes in Illinois
Tornadoes in Indiana
Tornadoes in Kentucky
Tornadoes in Missouri
Tornadoes in Tennessee
April 2006 events in the United States